The House of Wimpffen is the name of a noble family originally from Germany. They became prominent in the Kingdom of Bohemia during the Habsburg rule.

Notable members 
 Emmanuel Félix de Wimpffen (1811–1884), French general
 Franz (Emil Lorenz Heeremann) Graf von Wimpffen (1797, Prague - 1870), Austrian general
 Maximilian von Wimpffen (1770–1854), Austrian general during the Napoleonic Wars
 Leontius (von Wimpffen) (1873-1919), Russian bishop murdered by the Bolsheviks
 Pauline von Wimpffen, German writer and Catholic activist

See also
 Bad Wimpfen
 János L. Wimpffen (born 1950s, Graz), an American motorsport historian and writer of Austro-Hungarian descent

External links